Acorn Antiques is a parodic soap opera written by British comedian Victoria Wood as a regular feature in the two series of Victoria Wood: As Seen on TV, which ran from 1985 to 1987. Wood later adapted the concept into a musical, which opened in 2005.

Television version
Wood originally wrote Acorn Antiques as a weekly slot in her sketch shows Victoria Wood: As Seen on TV. She based it on the long-running ATV/Central serial Crossroads (1964-1988), and radio soap Waggoners' Walk (1969-1980). Swipes were also taken at current soaps such as EastEnders and Coronation Street with their apparent low production values, wobbly sets, overacting, appalling dialogue and wildly improbable plots.

Its premise—the lives and loves of the staff of an antiques shop in a fictional English town called Manchesterford—hardly reflects the ambitious and implausible storylines, which lampooned the staples of soap operas: love triangles, amnesiacs, sudden deaths and siblings reunited.

It also satirised the shortcomings of long-running dramas produced on small budgets with its little artificial-looking set, missed cues, crude camera work and hasty scripts. A lack of continuity is seen in distinct lapses where storylines are introduced and dropped between episodes and character development is forgotten. One episode, for example, is introduced as reflecting the current interest in health fads with a plot where the antiques shop is merged into a "Leisure centre and sunbed centre", never to be mentioned again. This story-line also reflected changes in the Crossroads storyline in the mid-1980s as a leisure centre opened at the motel where the serial was set. 

The deliberately haphazard opening and end credits, together with its tinny title music, also lampooned Crossroads. The opening sequence was updated for the second series, with a reworking of the theme tune and shots of Miss Babs, one of the leading characters, driving to Acorn Antiques in the firm's van. This too was a parody of the new mid-80s Crossroads opening theme and titles sequences at the time, complete with the use of vertical blinds to reveal the show's title as the blinds closed (naturally, the Acorn Antiques version did not work and had to be pushed by a stage hand). The end credits referred to "Victoria Woods" [sic].

Perhaps the most comical element of Acorn Antiques were the missed cues, harking back to the days when Crossroads was recorded live. Fictional floor managers and directors can be heard prompting the dreadful actors to say their lines, whilst the end of several scenes show the actors not quite knowing what to do with themselves with the camera still rolling.

References to other daytime television devices featured; after one episode a continuity announcer mentions an exhibition of costumes from the show touring several British towns, and after another episode a range of novelisations is mentioned (bearing such archetypical purple titles as A Waning Moon, and little resemblance to screened storylines). The announcement that the show's theme tune was available to buy as Anyone Can Break A Vase sung by Miss Babs, was a reference to the release of Anyone Can Fall In Love, based on the EastEnders theme and sung by one of its cast members, Anita Dobson.

Wood also created a spoof arts documentary about the show for her As Seen on TV special, in keeping with similar straight-faced "behind-the-scenes" shows produced about soap operas, which reveals the shambolic Acorn Antiques production, and interviews the self-obsessed fictional actors behind the fictional characters. At one point, when an obvious continuity error is pointed out, the hard-nosed producer "Marion Clune" (played by Maggie Steed) sums up the directorial attitude: "We professionals notice - Joe Public never clocks a damn thing." The documentary also depicts the actress portraying the drudge Mrs. Overall as being an archetypal soap diva called Bo Beaumont (although in the series the fictional end titles credit Julie Walters as Mrs Overall).

In the final show of Victoria Wood: As Seen on TV a sketch was shown where the actors playing Mrs Overall and Mr Clifford are supposedly axed from the soap and Bo Beaumont (Walters) breezes out of the studio (in a parody of Noele Gordon's firing from Crossroads), complaining to the TV news crew outside "Does a faithful dog expect to be kicked? That show was my life."

The sketches even led to a fanzine and appreciation gatherings where fans would dress up as the characters. In 2004, in a poll on its website, Channel 4 voted Acorn Antiques the 7th best comedy sketch of all time.

The show made a brief return to television in 1992 in Victoria Wood's All Day Breakfast, her satire on daytime television. A sketch of its soap, The Mall, ends with Mrs Overall returning to reopen Acorn Antiques, mentioning that the other principal characters had been killed in a bus crash (even though she herself had been killed off in the final episode of the original series). A special one-off episode was broadcast in 1996 in a programme to commemorate 60 years of BBC Television. One final sketch was shown in 2001 with the original cast and Nick Frost as an armed robber (as part of Wood's History of Sketch Comedy BBC1 series).

Episode guide

Series 1

Series 2

Musical

In 2005 Victoria Wood created a comedy musical version. Julie Walters, Celia Imrie and Duncan Preston returned to their original roles with Sally Ann Triplett replacing Wood as Berta, who alternated with Walters as Mrs Overall. Josie Lawrence and Neil Morrissey appeared as new characters. Its original run, directed by Trevor Nunn, had a sellout season in London's West End. It earned several Olivier Award nominations, with Celia Imrie winning Best Supporting Actress in a Musical. It was revived for a tour in 2007, directed this time by Victoria Wood herself.  

It tells the backstage story of the Acorn Antiques actors (as seen in The Making of Acorn Antiques) reuniting for a gritty stage reboot of the soap. In the musical within the musical Babs, Berta and Mrs Overall battle a corporate buyout from the head of an international coffee chain. Their fortunes change when Miss Bonnie, played by Josie Lawrence, is discovered to be their sister, and Mrs Overall their mother. As with the original TV series the musical is presented as derivative and amateurish; missed cues, chaotic choreography and jarring tone changes blight a production that parodies set pieces from its genre, notably Blood Brothers, Chicago and Les Miserables.

Several amateur productions have been staged in the last decade. Crescent Theatre in Birmingham presented the premiere of the first in May 2010, followed by The Leighton Masqueraders later that year. Richard and Thomas Ayre are listed as lighting operators, and Victoria Wood attended the opening night. Wigston Amateur Operatic Society put on their production of the show in May 2016 at The Little Theatre in Leicester.

Cast
 Miss Babs (Celia Imrie): the overwrought and lovelorn owner of Acorn Antiques, who moves from one 'crisis' to another. Opens each episode on the phone introducing a never-again-mentioned plot line. Wife of Mr Kenneth, who was himself never seen on screen, mother of unnamed triplets afflicted with "dangerously straight hair" (and, we discover in one episode, Trixie Trouble), the triplets are kept amused by trips in the Wolseley, Get Carter at the cinema and bedtime stories by Simone de Beauvoir. Miss Babs' torrid romances are hinted at but never seen: Mr Clifford once abandoned her by the handbags in a well-known store. Distinguishing features include a birthmark shaped like a moped. Her humanitarian credentials are revealed when she allows Mrs Overall a couple of hours off to attend her husband's funeral, provided she pops back at five for the hoovering.
 Miss Berta (Victoria Wood): a partner in the business who begins the series emerging from intensive care to discover that her deceased father (believed murdered in Dakar) has been seen buying a padded envelope in the post office. She later develops amnesia and marries Clifford (the Bishop of Manchesterford officiating) before discovering that she is not only the twin sister of Derek, but also the daughter of Mrs Overall, and the mother of an unnamed baby. In the musical version, Berta is revealed to be Babs's sister: both siblings are the daughters of Mrs Overall.
Clifford (Duncan Preston): the stolid, reliable leading man whose advances are rejected by Babs. Shortly afterward he reveals he has married Miss Berta who is suffering from amnesia. Mr Clifford's voice mirrors that of David Hunter, sometime shareholder of the Crossroads Motel. He has a jet-setting lifestyle: "Bored with Zurich or did Zurich get bored with you?" asks Miss Babs. In the series he is electrocuted whilst unplugging an iron. In the musical, it is revealed that Mr Clifford's father knew of the paternity of the triplets, since he had sheltered the pregnant Mrs Overall, one rainy night.
Mrs Overall (Julie Walters): the elderly tea lady, who believes all problems could be solved with a nice cup of tea, a macaroon and an anecdote. One of her many specialities is home-made sherry served in a mug. Her late husband referred to her as Boadicea. Asked why, she confesses, "He was barmy, Miss Babs". She is revealed to be the sole beneficiary of Berta's father's will, and mother of Miss Berta and Derek. The rather grand actress who "plays" Mrs Overall (Bo Beaumont) was a former lover of Lord Delfont. In the series she dies after choking on her own macaroon. According to Wood, the character of Mrs Overall was inspired by Mrs Mack in Take the High Road (overall being a deliberate pun on mac) and Amy Turtle in Crossroads (originally played by Ann George who was born in the same town that Walters spent her early years, Smethwick).
Trixie (Rosie Collins): also known as Trixie Trouble, a feisty, tarty femme fatale who works in the antiques-packing department until she discovers she is Miss Babs' daughter. After her off-screen marriage to Bobby she mentions having had jaundice, 'lots of' extramarital relationships (which may have included Derek, with whom she was in a car crash), and is seduced by her mother's cousin Jerez, shortly before she briefly runs away to Morocco with Derek. She also had a romantic interlude at the Formica Motel with Mr Kenneth, who gave her a leotard and a wet-look bra. She returns to become a nun, and later a mother superior.
Derek (Kenny Ireland): the handyman, and revealed latterly Miss Berta's twin brother and Mrs Overall's other child. A long-running affair with Miss Babs is hinted at and is briefly rekindled when his unseen girlfriend Marie-Therese Francine Dubois runs off, but this is interrupted by Trixie, with whom he also seems to have a relationship. He and Trixie later announce that they are 'travelling overland to Morocco' to find Trixie some nice jumpsuits. It is also mentioned that he and Clifford are secretly playing the accordion and the ukulele together. Derek is based on the character Benny from Crossroads. Kenny Ireland says he is still remembered best for his regular part in As Seen On TV. "Twenty-odd years ago I played Derek the handyman in Acorn Antiques. To this day, nice camp waiters quote my dialogue at me, and are slightly disappointed that I don't remember any of the lines."
Cousin Jerez (Peter Ellis): the foreign villain of the series, and previously unmentioned Spanish cousin of Miss Babs, who makes a rejected offer to buy the shop. Undaunted, he disguises himself as a postman (whose signature whistle is the theme to Limelight) to misdirect mail which would have warned Babs of a new motorway to be built nearby. His plans are thwarted by Clifford but not before he has attempted to seduce Trixie. He later returns, completely reformed, while on his way to begin a sandwich course in computer studies at Fuengirola Polytechnic, and gives Babs £25,000, thus conveniently solving a cash-flow problem at the shop.
Customers (Albert Welch and Michaela Welch): An elderly couple who appear in every episode, looking at antiques or leaving the shop.

Home media
A DVD containing Acorn Antiques as a full-length individual release was made available in a 20th Anniversary Collection on 7 February 2005. This was the first time that the extras played by Albert Welch and Michaela Welch were given an on-screen credit.

Acorn Antiques was released as part of the complete series of Victoria Wood: As Seen on TV on 2 April 2007.

References

External links
 Victoria Wood
 As Seen On TV
 Acorn Antiques: The Musical!
 A spoof tour website

Comedy sketches
Television soap opera parodies